Ramón Armando Guevara (born January 16, 1955) is a former  boxer from Venezuela, who twice competed at the Summer Olympics: 1976 and 1980. He won the bronze medal at the 1978 World Amateur Boxing Championships in the light flyweight division.

1976 Olympic results
Below is the record of Armando Guevara, a Venezuelan light flyweight boxer who competed at the 1976 Montreal Olympics:

 Round of 32: defeated Eduardo Baltar (Philippines) by decision, 5-0
 Round of 16: defeated Dietmar Geilich (East Germany) by decision, 5-0
 Quarterfinal: lost to Li Byong-Uk (North Korea) by decision, 2-3

1980 Olympic results
Below is the record of Armando Guevara, a Venezuelan flyweight boxer who competed at the 1980 Moscow Olympics:

 Round of 32: defeated Nyamyn Narantuyaa (Mongolia) by decision, 5-0
 Round of 16: lost to Yo Ryon-sik (North Korea) by decision, 1-4

References
 

1955 births
Living people
Flyweight boxers
Boxers at the 1976 Summer Olympics
Boxers at the 1980 Summer Olympics
Olympic boxers of Venezuela
Place of birth missing (living people)
Venezuelan male boxers
AIBA World Boxing Championships medalists
20th-century Venezuelan people
21st-century Venezuelan people